Last Wave Rockers is the debut album by the American ska punk band Common Rider, released in 1999.

Critical reception
The Chicago Sun-Times wrote that "Michaels delivers a solid set of tunes that varies the tempo from full-throttle ska-punk ('Castaways') to more laid-back skanking ('Signal Signal') ... the high points are pretty rewarding, and Michaels' voice is still an original one that's well worth hearing."

Track listing 
All songs written by Jesse Michaels.
 "Classics of Love" - 2:21
 "Castaways" - 2:14
 "Signal Signal" - 2:48
 "Carry On" 2:08
 "Rise or Fall" 1:51
 "True Rulers" -  3:09
 "Conscious Burning" - 2:58
 "On Broadway" - 1:17
 "Heatseekers" - 2:04
 "A Place Where We Can Stay" - 2:46
 "Walk Down the River" - 2:28
 "Rough Redemption" - 2:30
 "Deep Spring" - 2:07
 "Angels at Play" - 1:52
 "Dixie Roadrash" - 2:26

Personnel 
 Jesse Michaels - Vocals, Guitar
 Mass Giorgini - Bass, Vocals
 Dan Lumley - Drums
 Ken Vandermark - Tenor Saxophone
 Jeff Jacobs - Hammond Organ
 Mark Ardito - Guitar (plays leads on "Classics of Love" and "Heatseekers")

References

1999 albums
Common Rider albums